Arne H. Wicklund (March 13, 1926 – October 6, 1990) was an American businessman, lawyer, jurist, and legislator.

Born in Gile, Wisconsin, Wicklund graduated from Lincoln High School in Hurley, Wisconsin. While in high school, Wicklund was a reporter for the Iron County Miner newspaper. Wicklund received his bachelor's degree from University of Wisconsin–Madison and his law degree from University of Wisconsin Law School. He then practiced law in Hurley, Wisconsin and was in the real estate business. During the 1951 and 1953 sessions, Wicklund served in the Wisconsin State Assembly and was a Democrat. He was the right-of-way attorney for the state of Wisconsin and a Wisconsin Highway Supervisor. From 1964 to 1972, Wicklund served as Iron County, Wisconsin judge. Wicklund died at his home in Gile, Wisconsin.

Notes

1926 births
1990 deaths
People from Montreal, Wisconsin
University of Wisconsin–Madison alumni
University of Wisconsin Law School alumni
Businesspeople from Wisconsin
Journalists from Wisconsin
Wisconsin state court judges
Wisconsin lawyers
Democratic Party members of the Wisconsin State Assembly
20th-century American non-fiction writers
20th-century American judges
20th-century American politicians
20th-century American businesspeople
20th-century American lawyers
20th-century American journalists
American male journalists
20th-century American male writers